The Malabar imperial pigeon or Nilgiri imperial pigeon (Ducula cuprea) is a species of bird in the family Columbidae. It is endemic to the Western Ghats of India.

Its natural habitats are subtropical or tropical moist lowland forests and subtropical or tropical moist montane forests. It previously was considered a subspecies of the mountain imperial pigeon.

References

Malabar imperial pigeon
Birds of South India
Endemic fauna of the Western Ghats
Malabar imperial pigeon
Taxa named by Thomas C. Jerdon